Peter Little (December 11, 1775 – February 5, 1830) was a U.S. Representative from Maryland.

Biography
Born in Petersburg, Pennsylvania, Little attended the common schools.  He initially worked as a watchmaker, until he moved to Freedom, Maryland and engaged in agricultural pursuits.  He served as member of the Maryland House of Delegates in 1806 and 1807.

Little was elected as a Republican to the Twelfth Congress, where he served from March 4, 1811, to March 3, 1813.  He was not a candidate for renomination in 1812.  During the War of 1812, Little was commissioned colonel of the Thirty-eighth Maryland Infantry and served from May 19, 1813, to June 15, 1815.

In 1817, Peter and his wife Catharine had a son named Lewis Henry Little who went on to be a Brigadier General in the American Civil War.

After the War, Little was elected as a Democratic-Republican to the Fourteenth Congress to fill the vacancy caused by the resignation of William Pinkney. He was reelected as a Democratic-Republican to the Fifteenth, Sixteenth, and Seventeenth Congresses, as a Jackson Republican to the Eighteenth, and as an Adams candidate to the Nineteenth and Twentieth Congresses, and served from September 2, 1816, to March 3, 1829.  In Congress, Little served as chairman of the Committee on Accounts (Fourteenth and Fifteenth Congresses), and as a member of the Committee on Pensions and Revolutionary Claims (Eighteenth and Nineteenth Congresses), the Committee on Revolutionary Claims (Nineteenth Congress), and the Committee on Expenditures in the Department of the Navy (Twentieth Congress).  He declined to be a candidate for renomination.

After his tenure in Congress, Little served as judge of the orphans' court of Baltimore County.  He died in Freedom, Maryland, is interred in Freedom Methodist Episcopal Cemetery, near Eldersburg, Maryland.

References

1775 births
1830 deaths
People from Huntingdon County, Pennsylvania
Maryland National Republicans
Members of the Maryland House of Delegates
American militiamen in the War of 1812
Maryland state court judges
American militia officers
Democratic-Republican Party members of the United States House of Representatives from Maryland
Military personnel from Pennsylvania